The Haunted Curiosity Shop is a 1901 British short silent horror film directed by Walter R. Booth, featuring an elderly curio dealer alarmed by various apparitions that appear in his shop.

The film "was clearly devised purely as a showcase for Booth and Paul's bag of tricks", and according to Michael Brooke of BFI Screenonline, is "an effective and engrossing experience".

References

External links 

1901 films
1901 horror films
British black-and-white films
British silent short films
Articles containing video clips
1900s ghost films
Films directed by Walter R. Booth
British horror films
Silent horror films